The Ancestral Trail is a now out-of-print long-form fictional story woven throughout a 52-issue partwork children's magazine series that was originally published between 1992 and 1994 by Marshall Cavendish in the United Kingdom and Ireland, Australia and New Zealand, Malta, Malaysia, Singapore and South Africa, as well as translated versions licensed to local publishers in France, Germany (where it was titled ), Italy (titled ) and Spain.

Launching as a fortnightly fantasy series, The Ancestral Trail Trilogy tells the continuing adventure of a young man called Richard, who is brought to The Ancestral World to help the inhabitants of that realm to repel an occupying force known as The Evil One and restore good to the world. Originally twenty-six issues were commissioned for the part-work. After a successful first year sales, with projections reported at over 30 million copies worldwide, the series was extended to fifty-two issues, where Richard's adventures continued into a futuristic science fiction world known as the Cyber Dimension.

Background and development

In 1992, The Ancestral Trail storyline was published by Marshall Cavendish, a UK-based publisher known for their part-work titles, from a trilogy submitted by South African author Frank Graves. Under commission by Marshall Cavendish Fergus Fleming created and added characters after the manuscript by Frank Graves was deemed unsuitable for their type of marketing installment release magazine format, including focusing each issue on a new environment, a new adversary and ending each issue on a cliffhanger which would be resolved in the subsequent issue. Each issue featured twelve illustrations drawn and painted by Julek Heller.

The Ancestral Trail was extended by a further twenty-six issues and written by Ian Probert. The second year extension incorporated computer-generated graphics by Mehau Kulyk with Heller's graphic work. As one of the first publications to combine paintings with digital renders, a problem arose when it was discovered that at the time there was no digital storage medium available of sufficient size capable of accommodating gigabyte-sized scans. A solution was found by scanning Heller's illustrations at a lower resolution of 200dpi (not 300dpi which is industry standard). "We spent a great deal of time worrying about the repercussions of doing this", Probert retold in a blog post years later. "Surprisingly, none of our readers noticed".

The magazine was launched with a television advertising campaign in December 1992, playing off the series tagline "an epic story of myths, monsters, and magic".

Synopsis
Richard is an ordinary boy who is plucked from his normal life to save the Ancestral World. On his way home, slips and falls, causing him to black out. When he wakes, he is in the Ancestral World, where he meets an old man named Golan, the last remaining Guardian of the Ancestral World and the Keeper of the Life Force. Golan explains that Richard is the prophecised "Chosen One", and that the Ancestral World is being destroyed by a being known as The Evil One who is close to winning the battle against the forces of good.

Due to Richard's oddly-colored eyes, it is believed that he can restore the balance between good and evil: Richard's green eye sees the good side of life; his gray eye sees the evil. Golan sends Richard on a quest to recover six Life Force Pods, which have been stolen by The Evil One, as well as free seven captured Guardians. Golan equips Richard with a tunic that turns him invisible, and a powerful amulet, to help him on his quest, which he must complete in twenty-six days. During his journey through the Ancestral World, Richard crosses paths with and is subsequently accompanied by Orkan, a half-boar-, half-man-being searching for survivors of the Final Battle, and the aged dwarf Melek, a scribe who fled the Ancestral City with two books that will become invaluable throughout Richard's journey. Additional allies are encountered throughout Richard's quest, which takes him around the Ancestral World and back to the Ancestral City for a final battle with The Evil One's forces.

Unexpectedly, Richard arrives in the Cyber Dimension, a metallic world where machines rule and carbon-based organisms cannot survive, and where The Evil One resides. Before Richard can return home to Earth, he must traverse this new world populated by evil robots and life-forms who obey The Evil One. Richard encounters a droid, known as Robo, who informs him the way to leave the realm is by collecting seven Omni Pieces. Eventually Richard also meets Teeza, a silicon-based marsupial-like creature called a Wigmat, who joins Richard's journey after Richard defeats a machine who eats his people. Teeza, like Robo, can also hold Omni Pieces and becomes invaluable to Richard when Robo is lost for a portion of the journey through the Cyber Dimension. Richard also learns that The Evil One can also use the Omni Pieces to open a gateway to Earth, leaving it ripe for his conquest.

The Ancestral World – issues 1–26

The first issue of The Ancestral Trail, titled The Moss Beast, was bundled with a four-panel presentation folder which outlined the series and a short prologue which set up the ongoing storyline.

The Cyber Dimension – issues 27–52

Additional magazine content

Every issue of The Ancestral Trail was augmented with additional print content to engage the reader. The inner front cover of each installment featured a prophecy which referred to the events of that tale, these were later replaced by binary messages from a screen that appears on Robo's chest. Decoding the binary message reveals the weakness of that issue's main villain. Various tasks were included in the issues including spotting hidden artwork, such as the characters of Shoomi and Shoobi, two friendly amphibian creatures who quietly followed Richard on his quest and who could be seen around two times in every issue. Fragments of the Evil One's mask and random other 'canon' imagery were also hidden in the background art, as well as then-contemporary computing tech within the Cyber Dimension artwork.

Within the inside flap back cover of each issue, as well as aerial fragments of a graphic map, enabling the reader to create an illustrated layout of the Ancestral World. Information cards were printed in each issue which outline the real world legends that the series' antagonists were based upon. These cards were replaced by 'Techscan Cards', which told the reader about various scientific principles and theories. Role-playing games based on the content were generated from both free trump card sets bundled with each issue and later printed within the inside cover. A single letter block would appear in each issue, generating an anagram needed to be solved to win a competition - the prize was an Atari ST computer for the first half of the magazine's run, and a Sega Mega Drive for the second half.

Magazine afterlife

The game was never published due to the Amiga being withdrawn from the Italian market. Additionally, an animated series was proposed for development by Saban International. After Marshall Cavendish closed its partwork division in 2002, all rights and International Publication Rights and Copyright to the series were returned to Frank Graves, who subsequently published his own adaption of the revised part-work narrative across three books in trilogy format, titled The Ancestral Trail; Long Ago & Far Away, New Time & Time Again and a newly-written Once Upon a Time & Time Again.

References

External links
The Ancestral Trail Website
Arxane Ancestral Trail/Blogspot

Defunct literary magazines published in the United Kingdom
Fantasy fiction magazines
Fantasy books by series
High fantasy novels
Magazines established in 1992
Magazines disestablished in 1994
Partworks
Books illustrated by Julek Heller